Why Nations Fail: The Origins of Power, Prosperity, and Poverty, first published in 2012, is a book by economists Daron Acemoglu and James A. Robinson. The book applies insights from institutional economics, development economics and economic history to understand why nations develop differently, with some succeeding in the accumulation of power and prosperity and others failing, via a wide range of historical case studies.

The authors also maintain a website (with a blog inactive since 2014) about the ongoing discussion of the book.

Context 
The book is the result of a synthesis of many years of research by Daron Acemoglu on the theory of economic growth and James Robinson on the economies of Africa and Latin America, as well as research by many other authors. It contains an interpretation of the history of various countries, both extinct and modern, from the standpoint of a new institutional school. The central idea of many of the authors' works is the defining role of institutions in the achievement of a high level of welfare by countries. An earlier book by the authors, "The Economic Origins of Dictatorship and Democracy," is devoted to the same, but it did not contain a large number of various historical examples.

The authors enter into an indirect polemical dispute with the authors of other theories explaining global inequality: the authors of the interpretations of the geographical theory Jeffrey Sachs and Jared Diamond, representatives of the theory of ignorance of the elites Abhijit Banerjee and Esther Duflo, Seymour Martin Lipset and his modernization theory, as well as with various types of cultural theories: the theory of David Landes about the special cultural structure of the inhabitants of Northern Europe, the theory of David Fischer about the positive influence of British culture, with the theory of Max Weber about the influence of Protestant ethic on economic development. They most harshly criticized geographical theory as "unable to explain not only global inequality in general", but also the fact that many countries have been in stagnation for a long time, and then at a certain point in time began a rapid economic growth, although their geographical position did not change.

Simon Johnson co-authored many of Acemoglu and Robinson's works, but did not participate in the work on the book. For example, in a 2002 article, they showed through statistical analysis that institutional factors dominate culture and geography in determining the GDP per capita of different countries. And in the 2001 article they showed how mortality among European settlers in the colonies influenced the establishment of institutions and the future development of these territories.

Content

Conditions for sustainable development 
Beginning with a description of Nogales, Arizona, and Nogales, Sonora, the authors question the reasons for the dramatic difference in living standards on either side of the wall separating the two cities. The book focuses on how some countries have managed to achieve high levels of prosperity, while others have consistently failed. Countries that have managed to achieve a high level of well-being have demonstrated stable high rates of economic growth for a long time: this state of the economy is called sustainable development. It is accompanied by a constant change and improvement of technologies — a process called scientific and technological progress. In search of the reasons why in some countries we observe this phenomenon, while others seem to have frozen in time, the authors come to the conclusion that for scientific and technological progress it is necessary to protect the property rights of wide strata of society and the ability to receive income from their enterprises and innovations (including from patents for inventions). But as soon as a citizen receives a patent, he immediately becomes interested in that no one else patented a more perfect version of his invention, so that he can receive income from his patent forever. Therefore, for sustainable development, a mechanism is needed that does not allow him to do this, because together with the patent he receives a substantial wealth. The authors come to the conclusion that such a mechanism is pluralistic political institutions that allow wide sections of society to participate in governing the country. In this example, the inventor of the previous patent loses, but everyone else wins. With pluralistic political institutions, a decision is made that is beneficial to the majority, which means that the inventor of the previous one will not be able to prevent a patent for a new invention and, thus, there will be a continuous improvement of technologies. The interpretation of economic growth as a constant change of goods and technologies was first proposed by Joseph Schumpeter, who called this process creative destruction. In the form of an economic model, this concept was implemented by Philippe Aghion and Peter Howitt in the Aghion–Howitt model, where the incentive for the development of new products is the monopoly profit from their production, which ends after the invention of a better product. Since only pluralistic political institutions can guarantee that the owners of existing monopolies, using their economic power, will not be able to block the introduction of new technologies, they, according to the authors, are a necessary condition for the country's transition to sustainable development. Another prerequisite is a sufficient level of centralization of power in the country, because in the absence of this, political pluralism can turn into chaos. The theoretical basis of the authors' work is presented in a joint article with Simon Johnson, and the authors also note the great influence of Douglass North's work on their views.

The authors support their position by analyzing the economic development of many modern and already disappeared countries and societies: the USA; medieval England and the British Empire; France; the Venetian Republic; the Roman Republic and the Roman Empire; Austria-Hungary; Russian Empire, USSR and modern Russia; Spain and its many former colonies: Argentina, Venezuela, Guatemala, Colombia, Mexico and Peru; Brazil; colonial period of the Caribbean region; Maya civilization; Natufian culture; the Ottoman Empire and modern Turkey; Japan; North Korea and South Korea; the Ming and Qing empires, and modern China; the sultanates of Tidore, Ternate and Bakan, the island state of Ambon and other communities on the territory of modern Indonesia, and the consequences of the impact of the Dutch East India Company on them; Australia; Somalia and Afghanistan; the kingdoms of Aksum and modern Ethiopia; South Africa, Zimbabwe and Botswana; the kingdoms of the Congo and Cuba, and the modern Democratic Republic of the Congo; the states of Oyo, Dahomey and Ashanti, and modern Ghana; Sierra Leone; modern Egypt and Uzbekistan. Reviewers unanimously note the wealth of historical examples in the book.

Contrasting two types of institutions 
The decisive role for the development of countries, according to the authors, is played by institutions — a set of formal and informal rules and mechanisms for coercing individuals to comply with these rules that exist in society. Acemoglu and Robinson divide institutions into two large groups:  and economic. The first regulate the distribution of powers between the various authorities in the country and the procedure for the formation of these bodies, and the second regulate the property relations of citizens. The concept of Acemoglu and Robinson consists in opposing two archetypes: the so-called. “extractive” (“extracting”, “squeezing”) and “inclusive” (“including”, “uniting”) economic and political institutions, which in both cases reinforce and support each other.

Inclusive economic institutions protect the property rights of wide sections of society (not just the elite), they do not allow unjustified alienation of property, and they allow all citizens to participate in economic relations in order to make a profit. Under the conditions of such institutions, workers are interested in increasing labour productivity. The first examples of such institutions are, for example, the commenda in the Venetian Republic and patents for inventions. The long-term existence of such economic institutions, according to the authors, is impossible without inclusive political institutions that allow wide sections of society to participate in governing the country and make decisions that are beneficial to the majority. These institutions that are the foundation of all modern liberal democracies. In the absence of such institutions, when political power is usurped by a small stratum of society, sooner or later it will use this power to gain economic power to attack the property rights of others, and, therefore, to destroy inclusive economic institutions.

Extractive economic institutions exclude large segments of the population from the distribution of income from their own activities. They prevent everyone except the elite from benefiting from participation in economic relations, who, on the contrary, are allowed to even alienate the property of those who do not belong to the elite. Examples include slavery, serfdom, and encomienda. In the context of such institutions, workers have no incentive to increase labour productivity, since all or almost all of the additional income will be withdrawn by the elite. Such economic institutions are accompanied by extractive political institutions that exclude large sections of the population from governing the country and concentrate all political power in the hands of a narrow stratum of society (for example, the nobility). Examples are absolute monarchies and various types of dictatorial and totalitarian regimes, as well as authoritarian regimes with external elements of democracy (constitution and elections), which are so widespread in the modern world, where power is supported by power structures: the army, the police, and dependent courts. The very fact that there are elections in a country does not mean that its institutions cannot be classified as extractive: competition can be dishonest, candidates' opportunities and their access to the media are unequal, and voting is conducted with numerous violations, and in this case the elections are just a spectacle, the ending of which is known in advance.

Analysis of the economic development of different countries 
In fifteen chapters, Acemoglu and Robinson try to examine which factors are responsible for the political and economic success or failure of states. They argue that the existing explanations about the emergence of prosperity and poverty, e.g. geography, climate, culture, religion, race, or the ignorance of political leaders are either insufficient or defective in explaining it.

Acemoglu and Robinson support their thesis by comparing country case studies. They identify countries that are similar in many of the above-mentioned factors, but because of different political and institutional choices become more or less prosperous. The most incisive example is Korea, which was divided into North Korea and South Korea in 1953. Both countries’ economies have diverged completely, with South Korea becoming one of the richest countries in Asia while North Korea remains among the poorest. Further examples include the border cities Nogales (Sonora, Mexico) and Nogales (Arizona, USA). By referencing border cities, the authors analyze the impact of the institutional environment on the prosperity of people from the same geographical area and same culture.

Acemoglu and Robinson's major thesis is that economic prosperity depends above all on the inclusiveness of economic and political institutions. Institutions are "inclusive" when many people have a say in political decision-making, as opposed to cases where a small group of people control political institutions and are unwilling to change. They argue that a functioning democratic and pluralistic state guarantees the rule of law. The authors also argue that inclusive institutions promote economic prosperity because they provide an incentive structure that allows talents and creative ideas to be rewarded.

In contrast, the authors describe "extractive" institutions as ones that permit the elite to rule over and exploit others, extracting wealth from those who are not in the elite. Nations with a history of extractive institutions have not prospered, they argue, because entrepreneurs and citizens have less incentive to invest and innovate. One reason is that ruling elites are afraid of creative destruction—a term coined by Joseph Schumpeter—the ongoing process of annihilating old and bad institutions while generating new and good ones. Creative destruction would fabricate new groups which compete for power against ruling elites, who would lose their exclusive access to a country's economic and financial resources.

The authors use the example of the emergence of democratic pluralism, 
in which Parliament's authority over the Crown was established in Great Britain after the Glorious Revolution in 1688, as being critical for the Industrial Revolution. The book also tries to explain the recent economic boom in China using its framework. China's recent past does not contradict the book's argument: despite China's authoritarian regime, the economic growth in China is due to the increasingly inclusive economic policy by Deng Xiaoping, the architect of China's Opening up policy after the Cultural Revolution.

According to Acemoglu and Robinson's framework, economic growth will change the economic resource distribution and thus affect political institutions. Therefore, despite the current rapid growth, if China does not improve political balance, China is expected to collapse like the Soviet Union did in the early 1990s.

Theories 
 
The book is based on two major theories: the first theory explains the drivers of democratic and dictatorial regimes, while the second one goes a step further and explains how democratic regimes promote economic growth while dictatorial regimes prevent it.

Drivers of democracy 
Acemoglu and Robinson's theory on what drives democracy is rooted in their prior game theoretic work. This paper models mathematical reasons for oscillations between non-democracy and democracy based on the history of democratization of Western Europe and Latin America. The paper emphasizes the roles of the threat of revolution and social unrest in leading to democratization and of the desires of the elites to limit economic redistribution in causing switches to nondemocratic regimes.

A number of assumptions underlie their game theoretic model, and allow for the authors' simplified model of society. First, Acemoglu and Robinson assume that society is simply divided between a small rich class and a large poor class. Second, they assume that regimes must be either democratic or nondemocratic; there is nothing in between. Third, people's preferences in society are defined only by monetary redistribution from the rich ruling class. The more monetary benefits they get, the more they prefer the ruling class. Fourth, people care not only about redistribution today but also redistribution in the future. Therefore, people would not only want more redistribution today but also they want to see a guarantee for more or stable redistribution in the future. Fifth, the economic output of a country fluctuates year by year, which means revolution is less costly for the ruling class during economic downturn. Finally and most importantly, each individual in the society tries to maximize their own utility.

In their model, a country starts as a nondemocratic society in which a small rich group controls most of the wealth and rules the poor majority. As the ruling class, the rich receive taxation from the economy's output and they decide on the taxation rate as the only means of extraction. The poor majority can either take what is offered to them by the rich after they tax the output (the economy's output after tax divided by the population size), or they can choose to revolutionize against the ruling class, which comes with a certain cost. In a revolution, the poor's ultimate payoff is the benefit of the revolution minus the cost of the revolution. Under that circumstance, the payoff of the rich ruling class is split between, when the poor revolutionizes, the punishment for the ruling class and when the poor acquiesces, the taxation income.

That is, the authors describe a two-stage sequential game (diagrammed below) in which the rich first decide on the taxation rate and the level of redistribution and then the poor decide whether revolution is the optimal choice. Because of the potential loss of economic benefits by revolution, knowing what the poor majority would prefer, the rich have an incentive to propose a taxation rate that does not provoke revolution, while at the same time not costing the rich too many benefits.

Thus, democratization refers to the situation where the rich willingly increase monetary redistribution and thus franchise to the poor in order to avoid revolution.

Based on the analysis above, it is not hard to conclude that the threat of revolution constantly incentivizes the rich to democratize. The theory also resonates with a paper by Clark, Golder and Golder in which the government decides between predate and not to predate citizens based on the payoff while the citizen has the option to exit (migrate to other countries), remain loyal and voice their concerns at a cost (protest). Similarly, this game also provides insights into how variables like exit payoff, cost of voicing and value of loyalty change state's behavior as to whether or not to predate.

How democracy affects economic performance 
Given that the factors leading to democratic vs. dictatorial regimes, the second part of the story in Why Nations Fail explains why inclusive political institutions give rise to economic growth.
This argument was previously and more formally presented in another paper by Acemoglu and Robinson, Institutions as the Fundamental Cause for Long-Run Growth. With this theory, Acemoglu and Robinson try to explain the different level of economic development of all countries with one single framework.

Political institutions (such as a constitution) determine the de jure (or written) distribution of political power, while the distribution of economic resources determines the de facto (or actual) distribution of political power. Both de jure and de facto political power distribution affect the economic institutions in how production is carried out, as well as how the political institutions will be shaped in the next period. Economic institutions also determine the distribution of resources for the next period. This framework is thus time dependent—institutions today determine economic growth tomorrow and institutions tomorrow.

For example, in the case of democratization of Europe, especially in England before the Glorious Revolution, political institutions were dominated by the monarch. However, profits from increasing international trade extended de facto political power beyond the monarch to commercially engaged nobles and a new rising merchant class.  Because these nobles and the merchant class contributed to a significant portion of the economic output as well as the tax income for the monarch, the interaction of the two political powers gave rise to political institutions that increasingly favored the merchant class, plus economic institutions that protected the interests of the merchant class. This cycle gradually empowered the merchant class until it was powerful enough to take down the monarchy system in England and guarantee efficient economic institutions.

In another paper with Simon Johnson at Massachusetts Institute of Technology called The Colonial Origins of Comparative Development: An Empirical Investigation, the authors use a natural experiment in history to show that different institutions result in different levels of economic growth. The paper examines institutional choices during the colonial period of several nations in relation to the same nations' economic development today. It found that in countries where the disease environment meant that it was hard for colonizers to survive (high mortality rate), they tended to set up extractive regimes, which resulted in poor economic growth today. In places where it was easier for colonizers to survive (low mortality rates), however, they tended to settle down and duplicate institutions from their country of origin, as we have seen in the colonial success of Australia and United States. Thus, the mortality rate among colonial settlers several hundred years ago has determined the economic growth of today's post-colonial nations by setting institutions on very different paths.

The theory of interaction between political and economic institutions is further reinforced by Acemoglu, Johnson and Robinson in The Rise of Europe: Atlantic Trade, Institutional Change, and Economic Growth, which covers the economic rise of Europe after 1500. The paper finds that the Transatlantic trade after the year 1500 increased profits from trade and thus created a merchant class that was in a position to challenge monarchical power. By conducting regression analysis on the interaction variable between institution type and the Atlantic trade, the paper also demonstrates a significant interaction between the Atlantic Trade and the political institution: the presence of an absolutist monarch power hampers the effect of the Atlantic Trade on economic rise. It explains why Spain, despite the same access to the Atlantic Trade fell behind England in economic development.

Acemoglu and Robinson have explained that their theory is largely inspired by the work of Douglass North, an American economist, and Barry R. Weingast, an American political scientist. In North and Weingast's paper in 1989, Constitutions and Commitment: The Evolution of Institutions Governing Public Choice in Seventeenth-Century England, they conclude that historical winners shape institutions to protect their own interests. In the case of the Glorious Revolution, the winning merchant class established property rights laws and limited the power of the monarch, which essentially promoted economic growth. Later on, North, Wallis and Weingast call this law and order open access, in their 2009 paper Violence and the Rise of Open-Access Orders. With open access, equality and diversity in thought—societies are more able to flourish and prosper.

Critical reviews
The critical reviews below are notable responses either directly or indirectly addressed towards the book, the authors, or the arguments made by the book. The section below is arranged in alphabetical order of the respondent's first name.

Arvind Subramanian 
Indian economist Arvind Subramanian points out the potential problem of reverse causality in Acemoglu and Robinson's theory in his publication in The American Interest. Why Nations Fail takes political institutions as causes and economic performance as results for granted. However, according to Modernization theory, causation can also go the other way around—improvement of political institutions can also be a result of economic modernization. The book thus fails to explain why this alternative perspective does not work; however, a 2001 paper by Acemoglu and Johnson with frequent collaborator Simon Johnson introduced a two-stage regression test using colonial settler disease mortality as an instrument attempted to answer this question and is included in the book's works cited.

Subramanian also points out the limitation of the book to explain the recent economic development in China and India. Under an authoritarian regime (theoretically extractive political institution), China has achieved rapid economic development while democratic India (theoretically inclusive political institution) has lagged much behind. According to Surbramanian, one can say that China and India are outliers or that it is still too early to decide (that is, China might collapse and India might catch up according to the book's prediction). However, it is still unsatisfying that the theory is unable to explain the situation of 1/3 of the world's population, and it is unlikely that China or India will change drastically in the near future, according to the prediction.

Acemoglu and Robinson counter that their theory distinguishes between political and economic institutions and that it is not political institutions that contribute to growth directly but economic institutions shaped by the political institutions. In the case of China, even though the political institutions on a higher level are far from inclusive, the incentive to reform Chinese economy does come from political institutions; in 1978 from Deng Xiaoping's opening up policy at the end of the internal political feud during the Cultural Revolution. This exactly fits into the theory that the change in political institutions has shaped economic institutions and thus has influenced economic performance. This economic growth is further expected to shape the political institutions in China in the future. One can only say that China is an outlier to the theory when in the future China becomes as wealthy as U.S. or Germany but still remains an authoritarian regime.

Regarding the case of India, the authors deny an equivalence between inclusive political institutions and electoral democracy. Electoral democracy is the de jure system adopted by a country while political institutions refer to the de facto structure and quality of the political system of a certain country. For example, India's political system has long been dominated by the Congress Party; the provision of public goods is preyed upon by political patrimonialism; various members of Lok Sabha (the Indian legislature) face criminal charges, and caste-based inequality still exists. The quality of democracy is very poor and thus the political institutions are flawed in India, which explains why economic institutions are equally poor and economic growth is stymied.

David R. Henderson 
David R. Henderson wrote a generally positive review in Regulation but criticized the authors for inconsistency when talking about a central government's role in promoting development. In some parts of the book, the authors attribute the failure of the states like Afghanistan, Haiti and Nepal to the lack of a strong central government that imposes rule and order. However, in other parts of the book, the authors seem to embrace weak government for growth, as in the example of Somalia after losing its central government. In addition, Henderson asserts the authors have made two errors in the book about the United States. First, the authors falsely accuse "monopolists" like Rockefeller of being the extractive power. But in fact Rockefeller did not raise the price of oil but lowered the price to gain market share rather than to extract from the economy. Second, he says the authors are oblivious of the mainstream scholarship on American economic history between the American Civil War and civil rights movements in America. Rather than diverging from the rich North, the South was actually converging.

Francis Fukuyama 
In his article in The American Interest, Francis Fukuyama criticized Acemoglu and Robinson's approach and argument for being very similar to a book by North, Wallis and Weingast in 2009, Violence and Social Orders. Fukuyama approves of the books' central conclusion, which is that the failure of economies are often due to institutions beneficial to elites to the detriment of others, instead of the leaders' ignorance on policy matters. However, Fukuyama contended that the bifurcation of states into being "inclusive" or "extractive" oversimplifies the problem. This approach, he argues, lumps different institutions such as property rights, courts, electoral democracy, an impersonal state, and access to education, thereby failing to unpack their individual effect and makes flawed comparisons between societies across centuries. A modern state and the rule of law, Fukuyama writes, are demonstrably beneficial to economic growth, but popular democracy in poor countries can foster clientelism, corruption and hinder development. Fukuyama also points out that historical facts (on Rome and the Glorious Revolution) used to support the argument was flawed. Finally, Fukuyama specifically pointed out that the argument by Acemoglu and Robinson does not apply to the case of modern China, as China has "extractive" institutions but still flourishes economically.

In response to Fukuyama's comments, Acemoglu and Robinson replied on their blog. First, they agreed that their work is inspired by North et al.'s work but explained that they build on and complement each other's work. Second, with reference to the criticism of oversimplification, they countered by describing the oversimplification as an approach to decompose complex political institutions; it is necessary avoid focusing too narrowly on a single aspect of institutions. Last, on China, they attribute the rapid economic growth in China to the some (but yet limited) level of inclusiveness, as was also seen in the example of fast growth in the Soviet Union until the 1970s, but predicted that China will not reach per capita income comparable to those of Spain or Portugal with its current extractive institutions.

Jared Diamond 
In Jared Diamond's book review on The New York Review of Books, he points out the narrow focus of the book's theory only on institutions, ignoring other factors like geography. One major issue of the authors' argument is endogeneity: if good political institutions explain economic growth, then what explains good political institutions in the first place? That is why Diamond lands on his own theory of geographical causes for developmental differences. He looks at tropical (central Africa and South America) vs. temperate areas (North and South Africa and North America) and believes that the differences of wealth of nations are caused by the weather conditions: for example, in tropical areas, diseases are more likely to develop and agricultural productivity is lower. Diamond's second criticism is that Acemoglu and Robinson seem to only focus on small events in history like the Glorious Revolution in Britain as the critical juncture for political inclusion, while ignoring the prosperity in Western Europe.

In response to Diamond's criticism, the authors reply that the arguments in the book do take geographical factors into account but that geography does not explain the different level of development. Acemoglu and Robinson simply take geography as an original factor a country is endowed with; how it affects a country's development still depends on institutions. They mention their theory of Reversal of Fortune: that once-poor countries (like the U.S., Australia, and Canada) have become rich despite poor natural endowments. They refute the theory of "resource curse"; what matters is the institutions that shape how a country uses its natural resources in historical processes.

Diamond rebutted Acemoglu and Robinson's response, reinforcing his claim of the book's errors. Diamond insists geographical factors dominate why countries are rich and poor today. For example, he mentions that the tropical diseases in Zambia keep male workers sick for a large portion of their lifetime, thus reducing their labor productivity significantly. He reinforces his point that geography determines local plantations and gave rise to ancient agrarian practices. Agricultural practice further shapes a sedentary lifestyle as well as social interaction, both of which shape social institutions that result in different economic performances across countries.

Diamond's review was excerpted by economist Tyler Cowen on Marginal Revolution.

Jeffrey Sachs 
According to Jeffrey Sachs, an American economist, the major problem of Why Nations Fail is that it focuses too narrowly on domestic political institutions and ignores other factors, such as technological progress and geopolitics. For example, geography plays an important role in shaping institutions, and weak governments in West Africa may be seen as a consequence of the unnavigable rivers in the region. Sachs also questions Acemoglu and Robinson's assumption that authoritarian regimes cannot motivate economic growth. Several examples in Asia, including Singapore and South Korea, easily refute Acemoglu and Robinson's arguments that democratic political institutions are prerequisites for economic growth. Moreover, Acemoglu and Robinson overlook macroeconomic factors like technological progress (e.g. industrialization and information technology).

In response to Sachs' critique, Acemoglu and Robinson replied on their book blog with twelve specific points. First, on the role of geography, Acemoglu and Robinson agree that geography is crucial in shaping institutions but do not recognize a deterministic role of geography in economic performance. Second, on the positive role authoritarian governments can play in economic growth, especially in the case of China, the fast economic growth could be part of the catch-up effect. However, it does not mean that authoritarian governments are better than democratic governments in promoting economic growth. It is still way too early, according to Acemoglu and Robinson, to draw a definite conclusion solely based on the example of China. Last, on industrialization, they argue that industrialization is contingent upon institutions. Based on Acemoglu and Robinson's response, Sachs wrote a rebuttal on his personal website.

Paul Collier 
Development economist Paul Collier from the University of Oxford reviewed the book for The Guardian. Collier's review summarizes two essential elements for growth from the book: first, a centralized state and second, inclusive political and economic institutions. Based on the case of China, a centralized state can draw a country out from poverty but without inclusive institutions, such growth is not sustainable, as argued by Acemoglu and Robinson. Such process is not natural, but only happens when the elites are willing to cede power to the majority under certain circumstances.

Peter Forbes 
Peter Forbes reviewed the book for The Independent: "This book, by two U.S. economists, comes garlanded with praise by its obvious forebears – Jared Diamond, Ian Morris, Niall Ferguson, Charles C. Mann – and succeeds in making great sense of the history of the modern era, from the voyages of discovery to the present day." Besides singing high praises for the book, Forbes links the message of the book and contemporary politics in developed countries like the United States and the United Kingdom. Though the two countries are by far some of the most inclusive economies in the world, various parts of them are, by nature, extractive—for instance, the existence of a shadow banking system, of conglomerate manufacturers, and so on. He warns against extractive practices under the guise of an inclusive economy.

Warren Bass 
Warren Bass reviewed the book for the Washington Post, writing: "It's bracing, garrulous, wildly ambitious and ultimately hopeful. It may, in fact, be a bit of a masterpiece." Despite his applause, Bass also points out several imperfections of the book. First of all, the definition of extractive and inclusive institution is vague in a way that cannot be utilized in policymaking. Second, though Acemoglu and Robinson are ambitious in covering cases of all nations across history, this attempt is subjected to scrutiny of regional experts and historians. For example, their accusation of Ottoman Empire as "highly absolutist" might not be correct, given the level of tolerance and diversity inside the Empire as compared to its European counterparts.

William Easterly 
In a mixed review of the book in the Wall Street Journal, William Easterly was generally supportive of the plausibility of the book's thesis but critiqued the book's failure to cite extant statistics-based evidence to support the validity of the historical case studies. For example, in the book's example about Congo, the stated reason Congo is impoverished is that Congo is close to slave trade shipping points. The approach of this historical case study only offers one data point. Moreover, Easterly also points out the danger of ex-post rationalization that the book only attributes different levels of development to institutions in a way a bit too neat. For example, to explain the fall of Venice, it could be the extractive regime during the time or it could also be the shift from Mediterranean trade to Atlantic trade. The historical case studies approach might be biased.

Awards and honors
2012 Paddy Power And Total Politics Political Book Award (International Affairs)
2012 Financial Times and Goldman Sachs Business Book of the Year Award, Shortlist 
2013 Lionel Gelber Prize, Longlist
2013 Arthur Ross Book Award, Honorable Mention

Related works
 The Wealth of Nations by Adam Smith
 Guns, Germs, and Steel by Jared Diamond
 Collapse: How Societies Choose to Fail or Succeed also by Jared Diamond
 The Elusive Quest for Growth by William Easterly
 The Wealth and Poverty of Nations by David Landes
 Violence and Social Orders by Douglass North, John Wallis, and Barry Weingast
 The Modern World-System, vols. 1-4 by Immanuel Wallerstein

See also
 Critical juncture theory
 Environmental determinism
 Extractivism
 Modernization theory
 Resource curse
 States and Power in Africa
 World-systems theory

References 

2012 non-fiction books
History books about civilization
Books about wealth distribution
English-language books
New institutional economics
Comparative politics
Crown Publishing Group books